Business Television India (BTVI), formerly known as Bloomberg TV India, Bloomberg UTV and UTVi, was a 24-hour English news channel in the Business-Economy genre, run by Business Broadcast News Pvt. Ltd (BBNPL).  The channel's coverage ranges from the latest news on Business, Industry, Markets, and Stocks to Economy, Policy, Banking, Technology, Telecom, and Personal Finance. The Channel disseminates real time news in multiple ways, including television, internet, and mobile device.

History
The UTVi English business news channel was launched by UTV in April 2008, along with a content deal for ABC News through Disney-ABC International Television (Asia Pacific). Bloomberg also took a stake in the channel in 2008. By late 2009, UTVi had rebranded as Bloomberg UTV, as UTV had switched to Bloomberg for additional content. Reliance Group purchased UTV's stake in 2012 causing another rebranding to Bloomberg TV India.

On 1 August 2016, the channel was rechristened as BTVI from Bloomberg TV India after the licensing agreement between Business Broadcast News and Bloomberg LP came to an end. Earlier in January, both Business Broadcast News and Bloomberg had decided not to renew their licensing agreement, ending a seven-year-old partnership.

On 31 August, the channel suspended broadcast without citing any reason. In a message to its employees just hours prior, it said it has closed the gap with the market leader (CNBC TV18) to emerge as the second largest business channel.

References

External links
 

Mass media in Mumbai
Mass media in Maharashtra
Business-related television channels in India
Business-related television channels
Television stations in Mumbai
English-language television stations in India
Television channels and stations established in 2008
Television channels and stations disestablished in 2019
Bloomberg L.P.
Defunct television channels in India